The head coach was Brian McCloskey. Assisting him were Erin Whitten and Stephanie Jones.

Offseason
 June 19: Hockey East, in conjunction with USA Hockey and the University of New Hampshire, announced that it will hold a Nov. 22 exhibition game featuring WHEA All-Stars vs. the U.S. Women's National Team at UNH's Whittemore Center as part of Team USA's Qwest Tour in preparation for the 2010 Olympic Winter Games.
 July 9: Former New Hampshire skaters Kacey Bellamy and Sam Faber, are among 41 players named to the 2009 USA Hockey Women's National Festival roster. The Festival will be held Aug. 18-24 in Blaine, Minnesota. Twenty-one players from that squad will comprise the team that plays in the 2010 Olympic Winter Games.
 July 28: Four former University of New Hampshire skaters: Karyn Bye, Colleen Coyne, Tricia Dunn and Sue Merz will be enshrined into the United States Hockey Hall of Fame as members of the 1998 U.S. Olympic Women's Ice Hockey Team.
 August 20:The University of New Hampshire will face off against longtime nemesis Northeastern University at Fenway Park on January 8, 2010. It will be part of a Hockey East doubleheader and shall be the first outdoor game in women's college hockey.
 August 24:Kacey Bellamy, captain of the 2009 University of New Hampshire women's ice hockey team, was one of 23 players selected to the 2009-10 U.S. Women's National Team.

Exhibition

Regular season

October
 October 5: The New Hampshire Wildcats women's hockey team was ranked No. 3 in the country. The USCHO.com officials revealed it in their first Top-10 Women's Hockey Poll of the season. New Hampshire accumulated 115 points.
 Kelly Paton recorded a point in all nine Wildcats games in the month of October to finish with 15 points (4 goals, 11 assists), including one game-winning goal. In two Hockey East league games, Paton tallied one goal and three assists for four points. Paton matched her career high of three assists on October 18 vs. Niagara. She factored in 15 of the team's 35 goals (43%) for the month, and in three games she had a hand in all of the team's goals. Paton's other numbers included a seven-game assist streak, four multiple-point games and 2-1-3 in two games vs. nationally ranked teams.

November
 In six November games, Paton recorded seven goals and six assists for 13 points. In four league games, she tallied nine points (4 goals, 5 assists). Paton recorded her second career hat trick and also matched her personal best of four points vs. Rensselaer. She factored directly into 65% of the team's goals with 13 points (20 goals). Paton won back-to-back Player of the Week awards (Nov. 23 & 30).

December
 December 5: Genevieve Lacasse of Providence made 22 saves in a 4-1 victory as the Wildcats suffered their first ever conference loss at the Whittemore Center.
 December: Jenna Ouellette played in four games and accumulated nine points (5 goals, 4 assists) leading the Black Bears to three victories. She recorded a point in all four games and notched multiple points in three games. She played a part in nine of the 12 Black Bear goals in December and assisted on all four goals vs. Vermont on Dec. 4. She scored the game-winning goal while on the power play in a 1-0 win over Vermont (12/5). In addition, she notched a pair of goals against Union (12/11) and another pair in the finale at Union (12/12).
 December: Kristina Lavoie recorded two goals and two assists for a total of four points in three December games. She netted a goal at Boston College to help lift New Hampshire to a 4-0 victory. She matched her career highs in both assists (two) and points (three) at Dartmouth for a 4-1 win.

January
 On Friday, January 8, New Hampshire will compete in an outdoor college hockey doubleheader at Boston's Fenway Park. At 4 p.m., Northeastern will face New Hampshire in what is believed to be the first outdoor women's hockey game in the sport's history. At 7:30 p.m., the Boston College men's team plays the Boston University men's teams.
 January: Kristina Lavoie scored a goal in all six January games and finished with totals of seven goals and one assist for eight points. She led UNH in goals and tied for the lead in points. Two of her goals gave the Wildcats a 1-0 lead. In four games vs. nationally ranked teams, she accumulated six points (5 goals, 1 assists). On. Jan. 8 vs. Northeastern, Lavoie broke a 3-3 tie with 5:30 remaining in the game and secured the victory on an empty-net goal with 15 seconds to play. She was also a two-time Rookie of the Week in January (Jan. 11 and Feb. 1).

Outdoor game
 January 8: The Huskies fell to New Hampshire by a score of 5-3 in the opening game of the Sun Life Frozen Fenway doubleheader, the first-ever outdoor women's college hockey game. The Huskies held a 3-1 lead into the third period, but a four-goal rally by the Wildcats earned them the win. Freshman Brittany Esposito scored two goals and senior Annie Hogan added two assists.

February
 February 17: Courtney Birchard, Micaela Long and Kelly Paton are among 45 nominees for the Patty Kazmaier Memorial Award.
 Kelly Paton accumulated five goals and nine assists. In every game during the month, she scored at least one point. In three of the games, she had multiple-point games. For the month, she had a +4 rating. In the last game of the regular season, she scored the game winner versus Boston College. The goal gave the Wildcats the second seed in the Hockey East tournament. In the Boston College game, she matched career highs with three assists and four points in the game.

Standings

Roster

Schedule

Player stats

Skaters

Goaltenders

Postseason

Hockey East tournament

NCAA regionals

NCAA tournament
 March 13: The Minnesota–Duluth Bulldogs women's ice hockey program earned their fourth consecutive trip to the Frozen Four by defeating the Wildcats by a score of 2-1.

Awards and honors
 Courtney Birchard, 2010 WHEA First-Team All-Star
 Courtney Birchard, New England Hockey Writers All-Star Team
 Kristina Lavoie – New Hampshire, Bauer Rookie of the Month, of the Month, December 2009
 Kristina Lavoie – New Hampshire, Bauer Rookie of the Month, of the Month, January 2010
 Kristina Lavoie, Hockey East Rookie of the Year
 Kristina Lavoie, 2010 WHEA Honorable Mention All-Star
 Kristina Lavoie, 2010 WHEA All-Rookie Team
 Micaela Long, Hockey East Scoring Champion
 Micaela Long, 2010 WHEA First-Team All-Star
 Micaela Long, New England Hockey Writers All-Star Team
 Kelly Paton – New Hampshire, WHEA Player of the Month, October 2009
 Kelly Paton – New Hampshire, WHEA Player of the Month, November 2009
 Kelly Paton – New Hampshire, WHEA Player of the Month, February 2010
 Kelly Paton - Hockey East Co-Player of the Year
 Kelly Paton, Runner Up, Hockey East Scoring Champion
 Kelly Paton, 2010 WHEA First-Team All-Star
 Kelly Paton, Frozen Four Skills Competition participant
 Kelly Paton, New England Hockey Writers All-Star Team
 Kelly Paton, New England Hockey Writers Player of the Year

All-America selections
 Kelly Paton, 2010 Women's RBK Hockey Division I All-America First Team 
 Courtney Birchard, 2010 Women's RBK Hockey Division I All-America Second Team

References

External links
 Official site

New Hampshire Wildcats women's ice hockey seasons
New Hampshire
New Ham
New Ham